Las Bravo is a Mexican telenovela produced by María del Carmen Marcos for TV Azteca in 2014.

Edith González, Mauricio Islas and Saúl Lisazo. Carolina Miranda, Carla Carrillo and Paulette Hernández star as the leading teen protagonists.

As of 18 August 2014 Canal 13 started broadcasting Las Bravo weekdays at 20:00 replacing Siempre Tuya Acapulco. Production of Las Bravo began on 18 February 2014.

Plot 
Las Bravo is the story of Valentina Bravo and her three daughters – rich, privileged and prejudiced women who see her fall when the patriarch of the house dies. Leaving exorbitant debts, the four women will be forced to be evicted from their pride and get to work managing a new business, a nightclub for women. The Bravo's will have to learn to get along with a group of male strippers who are just as desperate to survive. Along the way, the Bravo's will learn about independence, to find themselves and find love.

Cast

Starring 
 Edith González as Valentina Díaz de Bravo
 Mauricio Islas as Leonardo Barbosa / Salvador Martínez
 Saúl Lisazo as Enrique Velázquez

Also starring 
 Carla Carrillo as Roberta Bravo Díaz 
 Carolina Miranda as Carmen Bravo Díaz 
 Paulette Hernández as Adriana Bravo
 Héctor Arredondo as Gerardo Ibañez / Gerry
 Lambda García as Fernando Sánchez
 Juan Vidal as Secundino Godínez / Adonis
 Pedro Sicard as Samuel Robles
 María Fernanda Quiroz as Rosa "Roxana" de Sánchez
 Eugenio Montessoro as José Bravo / El Toro
 Alberto Casanova as Manuel Campilla
 Mauricio Aspe as Patricio Castro
 Cecilia Piñeiro as Virginia Ibáñez
 Ángeles Marín as Miguelina de Bravo
 Claudia Marín as Evangelina López
 Fabián Peña as Aníbal Villaseñor
 Josefo Rodríguez as Cándido Pastrana
 Jorge Zepeda as Teodoro
 Lizeth Cuevas as Beatriz Alcántara
 Stefany Hinojosa as Tania
 Tamara Fascovich as Liliana "Lily" Castro
 Cynthia Quintana as Ingrid
 José Astorga as Jairo Velázquez
 Ernesto Diaz del Castillo as Gabriel Cisneros 
 Roberto Mares as José Primitivo Bravo
 Ángel Vigón as René Pastrana
 Esaú as Roberto "Robertito" Cisneros
 Patricio Guzmán as José Manuel Campilla
 Cinthia Vázquez as Xiomara

Recurring 
 Andrea Martí as Lucía de Martínez
 Betty Monroe as Candela Millán
 Salvador Amaya as Lucas

References

External links 
 

2014 telenovelas
2014 Mexican television series debuts
Mexican telenovelas
TV Azteca telenovelas
2015 Mexican television series endings
Mexican television series based on Chilean television series
Spanish-language telenovelas